Michael Francis Hickey (December 25, 1871 – June 11, 1918) was a second baseman in Major League Baseball. He played in one game for the Boston Beaneaters of the National League on September 14, 1899.  He played college ball at the College of the Holy Cross and he had an extensive minor league career from 1893 through 1905.

External links

1871 births
1918 deaths
Boston Beaneaters players
Baseball players from Massachusetts
Major League Baseball second basemen
19th-century baseball players
Brockton Shoemakers players
Springfield Ponies players
Springfield Maroons players
Syracuse Stars (minor league baseball) players
Amsterdam Carpet Tacks players
Pittsfield Colts players
Rochester Browns players
Nashua Rainmakers players
Schenectady Dorpians players
Winsted Welcomes players
Hamilton Blackbirds players
Toronto Canucks players
London Cockneys players
Torrington Demons players
New Haven Blues players
Newport Colts players
Worcester Farmers players
Meriden Silverites players
Meriden Miler players
Lowell Tigers players
Kansas City Blue Stockings players
Holyoke Paperweights players
People from Chicopee, Massachusetts